The external sphincter muscle of female urethra is a muscle which controls urination in females. The muscle fibers arise on either side from the margin of the inferior ramus of the pubis. They are directed across the pubic arch in front of the urethra, and pass around it to blend with the muscular fibers of the opposite side, between the urethra and vagina.

The term "urethrovaginal sphincter" ("sphincter urethrovaginalis") is sometimes used to describe the component adjacent to the vagina.  

The "compressor urethrae" is also considered a distinct, adjacent muscle by some sources,

Function
The muscle helps maintain continence of urine along with the internal urethral sphincter which is under control of the autonomic nervous system. The external sphincter muscle prevents urine leakage as the muscle is tonically contracted via somatic fibers that originate in Onuf's nucleus and pass through sacral spinal nerves S2-S4 then the pudendal nerve to synapse on the muscle.

Voiding urine begins with voluntary relaxation of the external urethral sphincter. This is facilitated by inhibition of the somatic neurons in Onuf's nucleus via signals arising in the pontine micturition center and traveling through the descending reticulospinal tracts.

See also
External sphincter muscle of male urethra
Internal urethral sphincter
Levator ani

References

Urinary system
Mammal female reproductive system